This list of botanical gardens and arboretums in Virginia is intended to include all significant botanical gardens and arboretums in the U.S. state of Virginia

See also
List of botanical gardens and arboretums in the United States

References 

 
Arboreta in Virginia
botanical gardens and arboretums in Virginia